Dissochondrus, or false bristlegrass, is a genus of Hawaiian plants in the grass family. The only known species is Dissochondrus biflorus.

References

External links
Native Plants Hawaii, Hawaiian Native Plant Genera - Poaceae, Dissochondrus biflorus, photo by G.D. Carr, Oregon State University

Panicoideae
Endemic flora of Hawaii
Grasses of Oceania
Monotypic Poaceae genera